François Ciccolini (born 3 June 1962) is a French football manager and former footballer.

Career
Born in Cozzano, Corsica, Ciccolini spent most of his playing career on the island, with SC Bastia and Gazélec Ajaccio. In his first managerial job with AS Porto-Vecchio, he took them to the last 32 of the 1999–2000 Coupe de France before losing to Bordeaux. He then moved into the ranks of Bastia, becoming manager in 2004 and being sacked in April 2005 when the team was 19th in Ligue 1.

Ciccolini returned to management in 2008 at Red Star F.C., and was dismissed the following March with the team in danger of relegation. After working in the youth teams of AS Monaco FC, he took the job at Neuchâtel Xamax FCS in June 2011. Following defeat in the first two games of the Swiss Super League season, he was dismissed in July and replaced by Joaquín Caparrós.

In October 2014, Ciccolini was hired at JS Kabylie in Algeria but left two months later to rejoin Bastia. He served as assistant to Ghislain Printant before taking the job outright in January 2016, with the team three points outside the relegation zone. They finished the season in 10th, but by the end of February 2017 they were 19th and he was dismissed and replaced by Rui Almeida.

Ciccolini's next job was at Stade Lavallois in the third-tier Championnat National. Early on in his tenure in August 2018, he made a threat of physical violence towards a Radio France journalist, and earned a five-month ban with the last two suspended. The following February, he made an obscene gesture towards fans at JA Drancy, and left his job by mutual consent days later.

In June 2019, Ciccolini returned to Gazélec on a two-year deal as manager, after the team's play-off relegation from Ligue 2. In May 2020 he was sacked, following the team's relegation to Championnat National 2.

In November 2020, Ciccolini was appointed at USM Alger back in Algeria. He was dismissed after his debut, a 2–1 loss to CR Belouizdad in the Super Cup, for "disrespecting government officials" by refusing to take a runners-up medal from prime minister Abdelaziz Djerad.

References

1962 births
Living people
Sportspeople from Corse-du-Sud
Association football forwards
French footballers
SC Bastia players
Ligue 2 players
French football managers
Expatriate football managers in Switzerland
Expatriate football managers in Algeria
French expatriate sportspeople in Switzerland
French expatriate sportspeople in Algeria
SC Bastia managers
Neuchâtel Xamax FCS managers
JS Kabylie managers
USM Alger managers
Ligue 1 managers
CO Saint-Dizier players
Stade Lavallois managers
Gazélec Ajaccio managers
Footballers from Corsica